Rufford  may refer to:
 Rufford, Lancashire, England
site of Rufford New Hall, Rufford Old Hall and Rufford railway station
 Rufford, Nottinghamshire, England
site of Rufford Abbey